Arthur Henry Winter (4 December 1844 – 31 December 1937) was an Anglican priest and cricketer.

He was born in Clapham Green, Surrey and educated at Westminster and Trinity College, Cambridge. He was a right-handed batsman and a wicketkeeper for Cambridge University in fifteen matches (1865–1867) as a triple cricket blue and for Middlesex in three matches (1866–1867). His brother and two nephews also played first-class cricket.

He died in Hemingford Abbots, Huntingdonshire aged 93.

References

External links
 Cricinfo
 Cricket Archive

1844 births
1937 deaths
People from Clapham
People educated at Westminster School, London
Alumni of Trinity College, Cambridge
20th-century English Anglican priests
19th-century English Anglican priests
Cambridge University cricketers
Middlesex cricketers
Gentlemen cricketers
English cricketers
Marylebone Cricket Club cricketers
North of the Thames v South of the Thames cricketers
Gentlemen of England cricketers
Gentlemen of Marylebone Cricket Club cricketers